Susanne Teschl (née Timischl, born 1971) is a biomathematician and professor of mathematics at the University of Applied Sciences Technikum Wien in Vienna, Austria. She is known for her research on the mathematical modeling of breath analysis.

Education and career
Teschle earned a diploma in mathematical physics at the University of Graz in 1995, and completed her Ph.D. there in 1998. Her dissertation, A Global Model for the Cardiovascular and Respiratory System, was supervised by Franz Kappel.

After working for the Austrian Science Fund, she joined the University of Applied Sciences Technikum Wien in 2001, and headed the Department of Applied Mathematics and Natural Sciences there from 2007 to 2010.

Personal life
Teschl is the daughter of Wolfgang Timischl, an Austrian mathematics teacher and textbook author. Her husband, Gerald Teschl, is a mathematical physicist at the University of Vienna.

References

External links

1971 births
Living people
Applied mathematicians
University of Graz alumni
20th-century Austrian mathematicians
20th-century women mathematicians
21st-century Austrian mathematicians
21st-century women mathematicians